Maung Thit Min, born Dewa (6 June 1953–5 June 2011) was a prominent Burmese composer and writer. His father Colonel Tin Soe was a member of Burma's Revolutionary Council (RC). He is a second son of U Tin Soe and Daw Mya Mya Than.  He studied his secondary education through St. Paul High School (State High School No. 6 Botataung, Yangon).  He began his writing career in 1971 and wrote fictional works including The Sun Rises in the East and Sets in the West, An Untold Story, Hug Me and Tomorrow is Blue. He began writing and composing lyrics for musicians, with his first release being an album for Soe Paing in 1974.

In November 2010, he was diagnosed with colon cancer, to which he succumbed the following year.

References

Burmese composers
Burmese writers
People from Yangon
1953 births
2011 deaths